Treat is a split cassette shared between by Dutch punk band The Ex and Scottish ex-pat tour mates Dog Faced Hermans. The album was recorded live while the two bands toured Europe together and was released only on cassette in 1990. That year the two bands also collaborated on the single "Lied der Steinklopfer" ("Stonestamper's Song") released under the name Ex Faced Hermans, as well as sharing live sound engineer Gert-Jan, credited as a full member of the Dog Faced Hermans who continued to tour with The Ex for more than a decade.

The following year the Dog Faced Hermans took time off and Hermans guitarist Andy Moor joined The Ex.

Track listing

Side 1: Dog Faced Hermans
New Shoots
Confrontation
Beautiful
Supressa
Bella Ciao
Too Much for the Red Ticker
Timebomb
Mary Houdini
John Henry
The Blantyre Exposlosion

Side 2: The Ex
Elvis & I
Mousetrap
No More Cigars
Meanwhile at McDonnas
Shopping Street
Tin Gods
The State of Freedom
The Early Bird's Worm
She Said
Stonestamper's Song
Dead Fish

Personnel

Dog Faced Hermans
 Marion Coutts -  vocalis, trumpet
 Colin Mclean - bass guitar
 Wilf Plum - drums
 Andy Moor (The Ex) -  guitar
 Gert-Jan - live sound

The Ex
 G.W. Sok - vocals
 Terrie Ex - guitar
 Luc Ex - bass guitar
 Kat Ex - drums
 Gert-Jan - live sound

References 

1990 albums